Bård Jørgen Elden (born 17 June 1968) is a former Norwegian Nordic combined skier who competed from 1987 to 1997. At the 1989 FIS Nordic World Ski Championships in Lahti, he won a gold medal in the 3 x 10 km team event. He is now the national team coach for Austria and recently won the team competition in the World Championships in Oslo, Holmenkollen 2011.

Elden's only individual career victory occurred in Austria in 1989.

Elden has also been national team coach and chief executive for the American Nordic combined national team. The brother of former Nordic combined and cross-country skier Trond Einar Elden, he represented Namdalseid I.L. during his career.

External links

Norwegian male Nordic combined skiers
Olympic Nordic combined skiers of Norway
Nordic combined skiers at the 1992 Winter Olympics
1968 births
Living people
FIS Nordic World Ski Championships medalists in Nordic combined
20th-century Norwegian people